Sree Guruvayoorappan may refer to:

Sree Guruvayoorappan (1964 film), Malayalam film
Sree Guruvayoorappan (1972 film), Malayalam film